The Ann Sothern Show is an American sitcom starring Ann Sothern that aired on CBS for three seasons from October 6, 1958, to March 30, 1961. Created by Bob Schiller and Bob Weiskopf, the series was the second starring vehicle for Sothern, who had previously starred in Private Secretary, which also aired on CBS from 1953 to 1957.

Sothern portrayed the character Katy O'Connor, the assistant manager of the upscale New York City hotel The Bartley House. Co-stars for the series included Ann Tyrrell,  Don Porter and Jesse White who had also co-starred with her in Private Secretary.

Synopsis

Sothern starred as Katy O'Connor, the assistant manager of a New York City hotel: The Bartley House. Katy frequently deals with the hotel's eccentric guests, alongside either her secretary and best friend/roommate Olive Smith (Ann Tyrrell), or her boss, Jason McCauley (Ernest Truex), who is frequently bullied by his wife Flora (Reta Shaw). Katy was also an advanced character for her time, in that she was a woman who had a position of authority. In this position, she oversaw many male employees, including lovestruck bellboy Johnny Wallace (Jack Mullaney) and suave French room clerk Paul Monteney (Jacques Scott). Storylines typically revolve around the personal lives of the staff and guests of the Bartley House. The setting of a hotel gave the series a chance to introduce a plentiful number of guest stars, often playing guests of the hotel.

Midway through its first season, the series underwent a retooling to improve ratings. The McCauleys are transferred to a Bartley House branch in Calcutta, and Katy is given a new boss, James Devery (Don Porter). Whereas Katy and McCauley had a strictly professional relationship seen on an equal level, Katy and Devery's relationship is much more complex. Devery often asserts his authority over Katy, and the two frequently go toe-to-toe with one another over various things. A romantic undertone to the relationship becomes apparent by the final season, and was addressed shortly before the series was cancelled. Due to the retooling, the characters of Johnny Wallace and Paul Monteney also begin to be limited. Jacques Scott was written out after the end of the first season; Jack Mullaney was initially retained for season two, but also written out after the first few episodes.

The Ann Sothern Show had strong ties to Sothern's previous CBS sitcom Private Secretary, which had ended a year before the debut of The Ann Sothern Show. Sothern's characters of Susie MacNamara and Katy O'Connor were similar, though O'Connor held a position of authority MacNamara did not have. Tyrrell had portrayed the character of Violet "Vi" Praskins, who was nearly identical to her character of Olive Smith. Porter's character of James Devery was also similar to his role of talent agent Peter Sands. Jesse White had a recurring role on both series, playing the antagonist to the central characters.

Cast

 Ann Sothern as Kathleen "Katy" O'Connor: the witty, perceptive assistant manager at The Bartley House, an upscale hotel in New York City. She frequently deals with the various situations that arise from the eccentric customers, or her boss, initially Mr. McCauley, later Mr. Devery. A spinster, Katy was an unusual character in her time, in that she was a woman who was not only in the workplace, but allowed the series to explore the issues women faced in the work force. Katy not only held a position of authority in the hotel, but also was the supervisor of many male staff members. Throughout the series, a potential romance between Katy and Mr. Devery lingered; it is finally touched upon in what became the series finale, ending on a cliffhanger ultimately never answered.
 Ann Tyrrell as Olive Smith: Katy's secretary and roommate. Also a spinster, Olive is a bit scatter-brained and naive. Nonetheless, she means the best, and is a loyal friend to Katy. In the third season, Olive begins dating – and later marries – dentist Dr. Delbert Gray. Tyrrell was a regular on Private Secretary, playing the similar role of Vi Perkins.
 Don Porter as James Arlington Devery: Katy's second boss, who is the manager of The Bartley House. Devery is a younger manager than McCauley, and is a much more stern, stubborn manager than he is. Devery tends to get carried away with new ideas, and frequently finds himself at odds against Katy. In what turned out to be the series finale, Devery realizes he is in love with Katy, and impulsively proposes to her; Katy kisses him back, but leaves her answer on an unanswered cliffhanger. Porter was also a regular on Private Secretary, where his character Peter Sands was the boss of Sothern's Susie McNamara. Unlike Tyrrell, Porter was not initially carried over to The Ann Sothern Show; he was introduced in an effort to increase ratings.

Semi-regulars
 Ernest Truex as Jason McCauley: Katy's first boss, the manager of The Bartley House. McCauley is a timid, elderly man, who likes to keep the guests of The Bartley House satisfied. In episode twenty-four ("Katy's New Boss"), McCauley is transferred to The Bartley House in Calcutta, India. The McCauleys were written out in a midseason retooling of the show, to include Sothern's Private Secretary co-star Don Porter.
 Reta Shaw as Flora McCauley: the wife of Mr. McCauley. Flora is a woman of high standards, who is portrayed as an overbearing, domineering wife who frequently bullies her husband. In In episode twenty-four ("Katy's New Boss"), she accompanies her husband when he is transferred. The McCauleys were written out in a midseason retooling of the show, to include Sothern's Private Secretary co-star Don Porter.
 Jack Mullaney as Johnny Wallace: a bellboy at The Bartley House. Johnny is a college student, who is working at the hotel to pay for his classes. He has an unrequited crush on Katy, who usually ignores it. Mullaney was the only one of the first season semi-regulars to appear in season two, though he is written out after the first couple of season two episodes to be replaced by Woody Hamilton.
 Jacques Scott as Paul Monteney: a room clerk at The Bartley House. He is a suave Frenchman. Though he survived the series' retooling midway through the first season, Scott was written out after the end of the first season.

Recurring
 Jack Wagner as Alfred, a desk clerk at The Bartley House. (seasons 1–2)
 Jesse White as Oscar Pudney, a scheming and dishonest newsstand owner who is the nemesis of Katy and Mr. Devery. White was previously a semi-regular on Private Secretary. (seasons 2–3)
 Jimmy Fields as Richy Gordon, a child prodigy playing the piano, who helps support his widowed mother and three sisters by delivering newspapers. (seasons 2–3)
 Ken Berry as Woody Hamilton, a young bellhop. Berry's role replaced that of Jack Mullaney's character Johnny. (seasons 2–3)
 Louis Nye as Dr. Delbert Gray, a dentist who becomes Olive's boyfriend and eventual husband. (season 3)
 Gladys Hurlbut as Mrs. Gray, Delbert's overbearing mother who dislikes Olive. (season 3)

Notable guest stars

Some of the notable guests stars of The Ann Sothern Show included:

 Jack Albertson as Mr. Dooley ("The Witness" and "Billy")
 Lucille Ball as Lucy Ricardo ("The Lucy Story")
 Frances Bavier as Mrs. Wallace ("Johnny Moves Up")
 Constance Bennett as Guinevere Fleming ("Always April")
 Joe E. Brown as Mitchell Carson ("Olive's Dream Man")
 Harry Cheshire as Justice of the Peace ("The Elopment")
 Jackie Coogan as Barney Dunaway ("Surprise, Surprise" and "Wedding March")
 Gladys Cooper as Dutchess ("The Countess of Bartley")
 Jeff Donnell as Helen ("The Girls")
 Kathleen Freeman as Miss Bennett ("A New Lease on Life")
 Eva Gabor as Elsa Kotchka ("The Royal Visit")
 Barry Gordon as Donald ("Governess for a Day" and "The Thanksgiving Show")
 Don Grady as Eddie ("The Thanksgiving Show")
 Joel Grey as Billy Wilton ("Billy")
 Charles Herbert as David Travis ("Slightly Married")
 Marty Ingels as Erskine Wild ("Always April")
 Van Johnson as Terry Tyler, a television writer who does research at The Bartley ("Loving Arms")
 Cecil Kellaway as Sean O'Connor, Katy's uncle ("Hurrah for the Irish" and "The O'Connors Stick Together")
 Guy Madison ("Katy and the Cowboy")
 Jayne Meadows as Liza Vincent ("Top Executive")
 Sid Melton as Tompkins ("Johnny Moves Up")
 Sal Mineo as Nicky Silvero ("The Sal Mineo Story")
 Howard McNear as Jack Lambert ("A New Lease on Life") and Mr. Bixby ("The Dog Who Came to Dinner" and "A Touch of Larceny")
 Janis Paige as Edith ("The Girls")
 Alice Pearce as Ethel ("Operation Pudney") and Lahona St Cyr ("The Beginning")
 Stefanie Powers as Mary Ann ("Mr. Big Shot")
 Cesar Romero as Bernardo Diaz ("Hasta Luego")
 Olan Soule as Johnson ("Katy's New Boss" and "Katy Goes Through Channels")
 Connie Stevens ("The Bridal Suite")
 Lyle Talbot as Eddie ("Katy's Investment Club")
 Mary Treen as Mary Conway ("One for the Books")
 Lurene Tuttle as Bertha Schyler ("The Widow")
 Estelle Winwood as Mrs. Parker ("One for the Books")

Crossover with The Lucy–Desi Comedy Hour
The second-season premiere featured a crossover between The Ann Sothern Show and The Lucy–Desi Comedy Hour (then titled The Lucille Ball-Desi Arnaz Show). In the episode "The Lucy Story", Katy is greeted by her old friend Lucy Ricardo (Lucille Ball), who has checked into The Bartley House after an argument with Ricky (Desi Arnaz). Lucy attempts to play matchmaker for Katy and Mr. Devery, but ultimately spreads chaos through her scheme, which backfires on her.

Ball was the only cast member to appear in the episode, with Ricky being mentioned as having gone on vacation with Charlie Snyder; at the time of filming, Arnaz and Ball were on the verge of a divorce. Ball and Sothern had been close friends since the beginning of their careers in the 1930s. In 1957, Sothern had guest starred on the premiere of The Lucy-Desi Comedy Hour ("Lucy Takes a Cruise to Havana") as her Private Secretary character, Susie MacNamara, who was also a friend of Lucy Ricardo. Arnaz was the executive producer of The Ann Sothern Show, through his role as head of Desilu.

Episodes

Series overview

Season 1 (1958–59)

Season 2 (1959–60)

Season 3 (1960–61)

Production
A film actress for many years, Sothern moved to television with the CBS sitcom Private Secretary in 1953. During the series' fifth season, Sothern discovered her business manager had embezzled money from her, and she owed back taxes to the Internal Revenue Service as a result. Following the season's end, Sothern discovered Private Secretary producer Jack Chertok had sold the series rights to Metromedia without her permission and sued him. Although CBS had renewed the series for a sixth season, Sothern departed the series due to the lawsuit, which was eventually settled out of court. However, she reprised her character of Susie McNamara on the first episode of The Lucille Ball-Desi Arnaz Show in November 1957, co-starring with her friend Lucille Ball.

Following the success of the special, and wanting more control over her project, Sothern established her own production company Anso Productions, to develop a new series with Desilu Productions, owned by Ball and her husband Desi Arnaz. Ball and Arnaz enlisted their writers, Bob Schiller and Bob Weiskopf, to develop a series for Sothern with producer Arthur Hoffe. Hoffe kept rejecting Schiller and Weiskopf's pitches, before they eventually went to Arnaz directly with the idea to center Sothern as a career woman managing a hotel. The duo also oversaw the first few episodes before returning to the Ball specials. Sothern enlisted her Private Secretary co-star Ann Tyrrell to co-star with her in her new series, and added Ernest Truex in place of Private Secretary co-star Don Porter. After General Foods agreed to sponsor the first season, CBS picked up The Ann Sothern Show in May 1958.

The series was filmed at Desilu Studios though not in front of a live studio audience like most other Desilu sitcoms of the era. Sothern reportedly did not like to perform comedy in front of an audience, and thus, a laugh track was used throughout the show's run. Some episodes featured a disclaimer during the end credits reading "Audience Reaction Technically Produced". Sothern and her sister, Bonnie Lake, wrote the series' theme song "Katy".

The series premiered in October 1958 to satisfactory ratings and an earned a Golden Globe Award for Best TV Show. Despite the respectable ratings, Sothern was reportedly dissatisfied with the series and felt Ernest Truex's character was funnier and was garnering more attention. Midway through the first season, Ernest Truex and Reta Shaw, who portrayed the role of Truex's character's wife, were written out. Don Porter, who had previously portrayed Sothern's boss on Private Secretary, joined the series as the boss to Sothern's Katy O'Connor. Ratings for the series improved, prompting CBS to renew the series for a second season. Jack Mullaney and Jacques Scott were also dropped from the cast at the beginning of the second season, and Private Secretary alum Jesse White joined the series. The second season also did well enough for CBS to renew the series for a third season.

At the beginning of the third season, CBS moved The Ann Sothern Show from its timeslot on Mondays at 9:30 pm EST (immediately following The Danny Thomas Show) to Thursdays at 9:30 pm EST. The move put the series in direct competition with the highly popular top 10 hit The Untouchables. As a result, The Ann Sothern Show ratings declined, and CBS chose to cancel the series in the spring of 1961.

Attempted spin-offs
During The Ann Sothern Show'''s third season, two episodes aired which were intended to be spin-offs. The series would have been produced by Sothern's company Anso Productions, but were not picked up by any network.

The first backdoor pilot, "Always April", aired on February 23, 1961, and starred Constance Bennett, John Emery and Susan Silo. In the episode, Bennett portrayed Guinevere Fleming, a former actress who had retired along with her actor husband David Fleming (Emery) to Vermont. Much to their chagrin, their daughter April (Silo) longs to be an actress and runs away from boarding school to the Bartley House. April meets Katy O'Connor, who convinces her to tell her parents of her plans. The second proposed spin-off episode was "Pandora", which aired on March 16, 1961. The episode featured Pat Carroll as Pandora, a young, slightly eccentric country girl who traveled to Los Angeles on the advice of her mother. Katy O'Connor hires her as a secretary for handsome Hollywood actor Anthony Bardot (Guy Mitchell).

Sponsors and syndication
During its run, The Ann Sothern Show was also sponsored by General Foods Corporation (Tang, Maxwell House coffee), Johnson Wax (Glo-Coat and Pledge), and Post Cereals. Sothern and her cast mates would often appear in commercials for the sponsors' products at the end of the episode. Sothern would then sign off with, "Well, goodnight everybody. Stay happy!".

The series was previously distributed by Desilu Productions, United Artists Television, and Paramount Television. In a unique situation, Sothern kept the rights to The Ann Sothern Show, even after Desilu was sold to Paramount. In 1980, Sothern and Paramount sold The Ann Sothern Show to Metromedia Producers Corporation. 20th Television currently holds the rights to the series.

Syndication
Cable channel Nick at Nite aired The Ann Sothern Show from 1987 to 1990.

Awards and nominations

Notes

References

Sources

 Schultz, Margie (1990). Ann Sothern: A Bio-Bibliography. Greenwood Publishing Group.  
 Spangler, Lynn C. (2003). Television Women from Lucy to Friends: Fifty Years of Sitcoms and Feminism. Greenwood Publishing Group. 
 Tucker, David C. (2007). The Women Who Made Television Funny: Ten Stars of 1950s Sitcoms. McFarland''.

External links
 
 Sitcoms Online: The Ann Sothern Show
 

1958 American television series debuts
1961 American television series endings
1950s American sitcoms
1960s American sitcoms
1960s American workplace comedy television series
Black-and-white American television shows
CBS original programming
English-language television shows
Television series by CBS Studios
Television series by Desilu Productions
Television series by Metromedia
Television series set in hotels
Television shows set in New York City